The Conservative Party (Spanish: Partido Conservador) was one of two major political parties in Bolivia in the late 19th century. The other was the Liberal Party. Between 1884 and 1899, all of the Presidents of Bolivia were members of the Conservative Party.

References

See also
History of Bolivia (1809–1920)

Conservative parties in Bolivia
Defunct political parties in Bolivia
Political parties with year of establishment missing
Political parties with year of disestablishment missing